(The Whole is Greater Than) The Sum of Its Parts is the sixth studio album by British electronic music artist Chicane. It was released on 26 January 2015 by Modena Records and Armada Music.

The album debuted at number 44 on the UK Albums Chart, selling 1,987 copies in its first week.

Background

On 28 July 2014, Bracegirdle announced that the title of his then-upcoming sixth studio album would be (The Whole is Greater than) The Sum of Its Parts on the ninth volume of his monthly radio podcast show Chicane Presents Sun:Sets on 28 July 2014. The title directly refers to a quote recorded by Greek philosopher, Aristotle.

The album received moderate reviews upon release, with The Irish Times garnering it 3 stars out of 5, claiming "it’s precisely what you might expect from a Chicane album".

Track listing

Charts

References

2015 albums
Chicane (musician) albums